A sinusoidal pump is a type of pump featuring a sine wave-shaped rotor that creates four moving chambers, which gently convey the duty fluid from the inlet port to the higher pressure discharge port.

Typical applications
 Ready meals
 Soups
 Sauce
 Frozen foods
 Salads
 Meat mixes
 Juice concentrate
 Chocolate
 Paint

Advantages
 Superior solids handling
 Powerful suction with low shear
 Little damage to product

See also 
 Swashplate engine

References

Pumps